The Emperor's Shadow is a 1996 Chinese historical film directed by Zhou Xiaowen and starring Jiang Wen, Ge You, Xu Qing and Ge Zhijun. It was the most expensive Chinese film produced at the time of its release.

Plot
Set in third century BC China, the story of The Emperor's Shadow revolves around the relationship between Ying Zheng, the King of Qin, and later the First Emperor; and the musician Gao Jianli. Gao Jianli's mother was the king's wet nurse when the young king was a hostage in the Zhao state, but they were separated after the former returns to Qin to become king.

After reaching adulthood, Ying Zheng embarks on a series of wars to fulfill his plan of unifying China. He kidnaps Gao Jianli from the Yan state to compose a powerful anthem for his new state. The two conflict over the new composition, the construction of grand public works, Ying Zheng's ruthless mass killing policies, and Ying Zheng's daughter, Princess Yueyang.

Cast
Jiang Wen as Ying Zheng
Tian Ming as young Ying Zheng
Ge You as Gao Jianli
Wang Peng as young Gao Jianli
Xu Qing as Princess Yueyang
Ge Zhijun as Zhao Gao
Wang Qingxiang as Li Si
Di Guoqiang as Wang Jian
Wang Ning as Wang Ben
Shu Yaoxuan as Xu Fu
Li Mengnan as Jing Ke
Yuan Yuan as Fan Yuqi
Ren He as Huhai
Zhao Yi
Wang Hong
Sun Bicheng
Zhang Chunyuan

Music and themes
The political use of music and of the arts in general is one of the major themes in the film. In one of the climaxes of the film, the king states his belief that through music he can "control the minds and hearts of the people", echoing Mao Zedong's Yan'an talks of 1942. Music is perceived by the monarch as being as important as military power. Whereas his armies can conquer his rivals, he needs the arts to exert spiritual and ideological control. At the premiere of the film on 7 June 1996 in Beijing, director Zhou Xiaowen noted: "Chinese rulers have always wanted to control our spirit. But they cannot succeed in doing so."

Reception
After The Emperor's Shadow was released in five major Chinese cities, it was banned by state authorities without any clear reason being given. Eight months later permission was given for re-release.

The film has been criticized in China for its many historical inaccuracies. Chief among these is the distortion of the character of Gao Jianli. According to Sima Qian's Records of the Grand Historian, Gao Jianli was a friend of the assassin Jing Ke, who fails in an attempt upon Ying Zheng's life. Other minor errors, mostly of academic interest, also contribute to the film's lack of historical authenticity. The director Zhou Xiaowen defended his film by saying that it was an exploration of ideas and values for the present day and was not intended as a strictly historical depiction of the First Emperor. In a 1999 interview, he said "I don't like history; I just like the buildings, the palaces, the dress."

The film influenced the creation of Tan Dun's 2006 opera The First Emperor.

See also
List of historical drama films of Asia
Hero
Qin Shi Huang (2001 TV series)
Rise of the Great Wall
The Emperor and the Assassin

References

External links
 

1996 films
1990s historical films
Chinese epic films
1990s Mandarin-language films
Films set in the Warring States period
Films set in the Qin dynasty
Cultural depictions of Qin Shi Huang
Chinese historical films
Films adapted into operas
Films directed by Zhou Xiaowen